Sharon Fichman and Maria Sanchez are the defending champions, but they lost in the first round to Shuko Aoyama and Renata Voráčová.
Sara Errani and Roberta Vinci won the title, defeating Aoyama and Voráčová in the final, 6–2, 6–1.

Seeds

Draw

References 
Draw

ASB Classic – Doubles
WTA Auckland Open